Ariarathia or Ariaratheia was a town of ancient Cappadocia, in the Sargarausene region, inhabited during Hellenistic, Roman, and Byzantine times. It was founded by Ariarathes IV of Cappadocia (r. 220–163 BCE). It was detached from Cappadocia and assigned to the province of Armenia Minor when that province was established. It became the seat of a bishop; no longer a residential bishopric, it remains a titular see of the Roman Catholic Church.

Its site is located near Pınarbaşı, Asiatic Turkey.

See also
 Ariaramneia

References

Populated places in ancient Cappadocia
Catholic titular sees in Asia
Former populated places in Turkey
Populated places of the Byzantine Empire
Roman towns and cities in Turkey
Hellenistic colonies in Anatolia
History of Kayseri Province
Populated places established in the 2nd century BC
Kingdom of Cappadocia